Castelbaldo is a comune (municipality) in the Province of Padua in the Italian region Veneto, located about  southwest of Venice and about  southwest of Padua.  

Castelbaldo borders the following municipalities: Badia Polesine, Masi, Merlara, Terrazzo.

References

Cities and towns in Veneto